Osman Murillo Segura (born September 18, 1985 in San Jose, Costa Rica) is a Costa Rican judoka, his trainer is also his dad Omar Murillo Salazar, Osman trained Judo since 5 years old in Judo San Francisco Academy, Osman is also well known in the Costarrican Judo Federation (Fecojudo) by all the National Sports Games hosted by the ICODER. He competed in the men's 73 kg event at the 2012 Summer Olympics and was eliminated by Hussein Hafiz in the second round.

References

1985 births
Living people
Costa Rican male judoka
Olympic judoka of Costa Rica
Judoka at the 2012 Summer Olympics
People from San José, Costa Rica